The Grande Aiguille Rousse is a mountain peak of the Graian Alps in Savoie, France, situated between the Maurienne and Tarentaise valleys near the Italian border. Not far from Levanna, the Grande Aiguille Rousse overlooks Serrù Lake and the Gran Paradiso National Park in Italy.

Geography 
At the crossroads of the Maurienne and Tarentaise valleys, not far from the Col de l'Iseran, the Grande Aiguille Rousse lies in the region where the waters that flow through these great alpine valleys diverge. The Grande Aiguille Rousse is shared by the communes of Val-d'Isère and Bonneval-sur-Arc.

Ascent 
The most common route for hiking up the mountain is from Val-d'Isère via the Prariond Refuge, or alternatively from Bonneval-sur-Arc via the Carro Refuge or the Col du Montet mountain pass.

Refuges 
The mountain refuges which can be used as a starting point for the ascent or simply for a visit to the mountain are the following:
 Prariond Refuge - 
  - 
 Carro Refuge -

References 

Mountains of Savoie
Mountains of the Alps
Alpine three-thousanders
France–Italy border